Thomson Andrews (born on 25 September 1987, in Mumbai, India) is India's first contemporary R&B, Pop, Funk & Soul singer-songwriter, performer, recording artist, actor, TV host and one of the newer contemporary Indian Bollywood Playback singers. Thomson started his career with Grammy and Academy Award-winning Music Composer A R Rahman in 2010 and to date has sung in several Bollywood and South Indian films. He is known for his associations with music projects such as Coke Studio (India), MTV Unplugged (India) and has been featured on MTV India along with composers Amit Trivedi, Clinton Cerejo, Shankar Ehsaan Loy, Pritam, Ranjit Barot and singers Neha Kakkar, Arijit Singh, Sonu Nigam, Shafqat Amanat Ali, Agnee, Indian Ocean. Thomson has worked with Indian Music and Film stalwarts such as Vishal Bhardwaj, Mira Nair, Vishal Shekhar, Salim Sulaiman, Ajay Atul, Hitesh Sonik, Leslie Lewis, Anu Malik, Amaal Malik, and Sohail Sen. He has also toured with legendary singers such as Sunidhi Chauhan for 3 years as a filler performer, and singer Mohit Chauhan for 2 years. In 2017, Thomson performed for Amazon Prime India on a music and dance reality TV show called The Remix, on which he was the finalist, along with his DJ partner NSG. After that Thomson was hired by American Idol to promote the show among Indian audiences via Indian Broadcasting Channel ZeeCafe.

Thomson has sung for Netflix films—Jingle Jangle: A Christmas Journey, The Christmas Chronicles 2, Ludo, Netflix animated series Centaurworld, Money Heist Season 5 Promo song Jaldi Aao and sung on the background score of the upcoming film Brahmāstra, directed by Ayan Mukerji. Thomson' singles and Remixes are released across all major Indian record labels such as "Uff Teri Ada", "Suit Suit Karda", "Hare Ram" on Tseries, "Rockstar Live" on Zee Music Company , and Happy Nagar on Times Music.

Thomson has sung on numerous Hindi dubbed Disney productions ; including from the Winnie The Pooh franchise, The Little Mermaid TV series, and films Encanto, The Jungle Book 2, 2019's The Lion King and Aladdin , 2017's Beauty and the Beast, as well as Toy Story, Frozen, The Princess and the Frog and Marvel Studios's Hawkeye series on Disney+. He is the dub voice of 'Wembley' on Apple TV+'s comedy puppet series Fraggle Rock: Back to the Rock and Gonger on Sesame Street.

He has been certified as a Performing Vocalist by Trinity College Of Music, London, and has briefly trained in Hindustani classical singing. Apart from live performances, he also sings on and arranges voicings for films playback songs & background scores. Thomson has sung film songs and ad jingles in several Indian languages such as – Hindi, Tamil, Telugu, Malayalam, Kannada, Tulu, Marathi, Bengali. He also has several International ad jingles to his credit for products in Kenya, Tanzania, Nigeria, West Indies, and more. He also sings in foreign languages such as Swahili, Portuguese, Spanish, Turkish and more. His debut Neo-Soul single ' People Ain't Things was mastered by Grammy Award winning mastering engineer Reuben Cohen from Lurssen Mastering in Hollywood, California. He is one of the few Indian indie artists whose music has featured on national television networks like MTV Indies, VH1 India and 9xO and the radio station Radio One (India). He is also known for his quirky style, funky hair- do's, and glasses. Thomson performed for Vogue India's Women Empowerment initiative #VogueEmpower in 2014. Besides his solo accolades, projects, Motown, R&B, Funk music tribute concerts and collaborations, he is part of a popular Indian A cappella ensemble called Raaga Trippin' with whom he performs live shows and creates unique renditions of cover songs as well as originals.

In 2020, Embracing an open format and interactive style to his performances, Thomson's musical influences and songwriting skills include the genres of pop, R&B, funk, Neo-soul, blues, soul, jazz, gospel, hip-hop, opera, soft rock, rock and roll and Sufi. He also mentors new talent via his Indie Music Label Throan Of Art Music, guiding them with professional singing tips onstage and in the recording studio.

Early life
Andrews' involvement in music began when he sang at school competitions. As a Roman Catholic, he also participated in his church choir. His family had roots in Gospel music and its related genres such as blues, soul, and R&B. Andrews was born in Mumbai to a liberal South Indian family, with a father from Kerala and a mother from Chennai. In 2005, he won a gospel talent show at the age of seventeen. He continued working while pursuing his college education as a science major. Andrews did not pursue music full-time. Instead, he began a corporate career and worked for four years, gaining experience in auditing, human resources, inventory, and contact centres among others. To pursue his musical ambitions, Andrews switched to teaching Western music. He then started doing shows and concert performances.

Career
He began his music career when he performed at the Indian Premier League (IPL) awards show with A. R. Rahman, his choir conductor Celeste Cordo and his mentor Clinton Cerejo. Subsequently, he worked with ad composer Rupert Fernandes who used his voice on ad jingles for products like Nestlé, HCL, and Volkswagen. After the IPL, he continued working with A. R. Rahman on film projects, songs, and background scores with Clinton Cerejo and Suzanne D'Mello.

Andrews has lent his voice to movie songs as an additional vocalist for music directors and has sung on projects and jingles for various ad jingle composers in the advertising industry. His credits for singing and vocal arrangements are mentioned in Bollywood film productions from 2014 to 2015 including Dhoom 3, D-Day, Bhaag Milkha Bhaag, Bang Bang, Happy New Year, Hasee Toh Phasee, Byomkesh Bakshi, and Bombay Velvet. He sang playback songs "Bach Ke Bakshi" for the 2015 movie Byomkesh Bakshi for music director Sneha Khanwalkar; "Shehar Mera" for the movie One By Two for music directors Shankar–Ehsaan–Loy; and "Rumani," a duet with Shalmali Kholgade in the movie Akaash Vani for music director Hitesh Sonik. Apart from Bollywood films, he has also sung playback songs in South Indian films for music director M. Ghibran: "Saridhaana Saridhaana" for the Tamil movie Amara Kaaviyam, "Rajadhi Rajanappa" song for the Telugu film Run Raja Run, "O Pagol Mon" for the Bengali movie Dashami and "Kanna Muche" for the Tulu Film Aamait Asal Eemait Kusal.

Throughout his journey as a full-time vocalist, Andrews has been associated with international music projects. He has sung on the background score of the Oscar-nominated Hollywood film 127 Hours for A. R. Rahman and has lent additional vocals on the song "Satyameva Jayathe" (song) from the international album SuperHeavy for A. R. Rahman involving Mick Jagger, Joss Stone, and Damian Marley. He has also worked with Indian Hollywood filmmaker Mira Nair along with music director Vishal Bhardwaj on songs for the musical adaptation of her film Monsoon Wedding. He has performed in an international opera Madama Butterfly including cast members from Austria, Korea, and America staged at the National Centre for the Performing Arts (India) and has musically directed adaptations of the musicals Joseph and the Amazing Technicolor Dreamcoat and Oliver staged in Mumbai and played the role of Mr Bumble in Oliver. He performed with the Cadenza Kantori choir at The Rottenburg am Neckar Festival of Choirs in Germany and at Taizé Community in Burgundy, France in his early 20s.
 
He can sing in 12 languages and currently performs across the globe. He is also associated with Sunidhi Chauhan's Live Bollywood music concerts. He is also featured in the worldwide Amazon Prime Original music show The Remix as one of the newer contemporary Indian playback singers and live performers. He sang for 100+ TV Commercials including Iconic Brands such as ESPN, Nestlé, Samsung phones, Hindustan Unilever, Mahindra, Tata, Sony, Gatorade, Volkswagen, Kinderjoy, Wrigley, Maruti Suzuki, Sunfeast by ITC, Airtel, Amazon fashion, Myntra, Serengeti Beer, Zee Cafe, Kingfisher, Reliance trends, Raymonds suiting, Shell Petrol and more.

In April 2014, Andrews launched his debut single, "People Ain't Things", a collaboration with Grammy Award-winning sound mixer Reuben Cohen (Hollywood) and Deepak Palikonda. The track won prominent airtime on MTV Indies, VH1 India, 9XO, and Radio One.

In 2015, Thomson, as RaagaTrippin, hosted the red carpet event at the Radio Mirchi Music Awards 2015 and performed at the Global Indian Music Academy Awards 2015 with music director Pritam Chakraborty. As RaagaTrippin, he also performed at the Indian Premier League opening ceremony in 2015 with music director Pritam Chakraborty.

Since then he has released other singles: "I Got Your Money" in 2017, "We’re No Strangers" in 2018, and "Ke Holi Hain" in 2018. The latter two songs were favourably received and were played frequently on BBC Asian Network Radio – London. They were tracks of the week at IGYM. The song's music videos have garnered more than one million YouTube views.

Thomson, who is also known as a trendsetter in fashion for his quirky style, funky hair-dos, and outlandish glasses, performed for Vogue Indias Women Empowerment initiative #VogueEmpower in 2014. He organizes Motown, R&B, funk, and soul music tribute concerts in Mumbai.

In 2019, Thomson explored the opportunity of being a TV host for a 6 episode music travel-based reality show, shot across India; called Royal Stag Hungama Music Bus. There he experienced Indian culture, the local cuisine, cultural music and impromptu jams with homegrown bands, and Indian popular celebrity music icons from each city and state. Along with the local bands, these celebrities would jam with Thomson, and together they would vibe on a tour bus named Royal Stag Hungama Music Bus. These celebrities shared their untold experiences, followed by a light-hearted chat about music, food, and more. The event would then end with a concert performed by the music icons for their fans in that particular state or city. This music travel reality show featured the likes of Javed Ali, Hardy Sandhu, Jassi Gill, Indian Ocean, Jeet Ganguly & Revanth, which aired on Showbox Channel and on Hungama Digital Media.

Singles

References

ISNI – https://isni.org/isni/0000000466861866

 Bollywood playback singers
 Indian male playback singers
 Musicians from Mumbai
 Living people
1987 births
 Rhythm and blues musicians
 Funk singers
Indian pop singers
 Soul musicians
 Entrepreneurship in India